Technomancer may refer to:

Games
GURPS Technomancer, a 1998 campaign setting published by Steve Jackson Games
The Technomancer, a 2016 video game

Other uses
Technomancer (album), a 2015 album by Pictureplane

See also
Technomage (disambiguation)